USS Ontario may refer to the following ships of the United States Navy:

  was a lake schooner in the United States Navy during the War of 1812
  was a 16-gun rated  sloop-of-war in the United States Navy during the years following the War of 1812
 A screw sloop was laid down in 1863 as Ontario, renamed New York in 1869, and sold while still on the stocks, in 1888
 Another Ontario was launched in 1908, decommissioned 7 April 1913, converted into a repair ship and renamed  in 1914
  was a single screw seagoing tugboat commissioned in 1912 and served until 1946

See also
 Ontario (disambiguation)
 
 

United States Navy ship names